This article concerns current football broadcasting rights held by television companies in the United Kingdom.

BBC Sport 
 FIFA World Cup Finals - Live coverage and highlights on BBC Sport (Shared with ITV Sport)
 Premier League - Highlights on BBC Sport (Live coverage on Sky Sports & BT Sport)
 FA Cup - Live matches & Highlights on BBC Sport (Shared with BT Sport)
 FA Community Shield - Highlights on BBC Sport (Live on BT Sport)
 FA Women's Cup - Live coverage of final on BBC Sport
 FA Women's Super League - Highlights on BBC Sport (Live on BT Sport)
 FIFA Women's World Cup - Live coverage & Highlights on BBC Sport
 UEFA Women's Championship - Live coverage & Highlights on BBC Sport

ITV Sport  
 FIFA World Cup Finals - Live coverage and highlights on ITV Sport (Shared with BBC Sport)
 England Internationals - All England European Championship Qualifiers, World Cup Qualifiers & Friendly Matches Live on ITV Sport (Highlights on Sky Sports)
 European Qualifiers - 1 non home nations Match per Matchday Live on ITV Sport & highlights of all home nations (Live on Sky Sports)
 FA Youth Cup - Live Matches on ITV Sport (Shared with BT Sport)

Quest  
 The Football League - Highlights of The Football League, Football League Cup & Johnstone Paint Trophy on Quest (Live on Sky Sports)

Sky Sports  
 Premier League - Live coverage & Highlights on Sky Sports (Live Coverage also on BT Sport & Highlights on BBC Sport)
 England football team - Highlights of every England Qualifier on Sky Sports (Live on ITV Sport)
 The Football League, Football League Cup & Football League Trophy - Live coverage & Highlights on Sky Sports (Highlights on Quest)
 Scottish Premiership & Scottish Football League - Live coverage & Highlights on Sky Sports (Also live with BT Sport & highlights on BBC Sport Scotland)
 Scottish Cup - Live coverage & Highlights on Sky Sports (Shared with BBC Sport Scotland)
 Scottish Youth Cup - Live coverage on Sky Sports
 Wales football team - All matches live on Sky Sports (Highlights on S4C & ITV Sport)
 Northern Ireland football team - All matches live on Sky Sports (Highlights on ITV Sport)
 Scotland football team - All matches live on Sky Sports (Highlights on ITV Sport)

BT Sport  
 Premier League - Live Coverage & highlights on BT Sport (Also live on Sky Sports & Highlights on BBC Sport)
 FA Cup - Live Coverage & highlights on BT Sport (Shared with BBC Sport)
 UEFA Champions League - Live Coverage & highlights on BT Sport
 UEFA Europa League - Live Coverage & highlights on BT Sport
 UEFA Super Cup - Live Coverage & highlights on BT Sport
 National League - Live Coverage & highlights on BT Sport 
 FA Trophy Live Coverage & highlights on BT Sport
 FA Youth Cup Live Coverage on BT Sport (Shared with ITV Sport)
 FA Community Shield - Live Coverage on BT Sport (Highlights on BBC Sport)
 England national under-21 football team Live Coverage on BT Sport
 Scottish Professional Football League Live Coverage & highlights on BT Sport (Also live on Sky Sports & Highlights on BBC Sport Scotland)
 Scottish League Cup - Live coverage & Highlights on BBC Sport Scotland
 Bundesliga, 2. Bundesliga - Live Coverage on BT Sport
 Ligue 1 & Coupe de la Ligue - Live Coverage on BT Sport
 A-League - Live Coverage on BT Sport
 FA WSL - Live Coverage on BT Sport (Highlights on BBC Sport)

Eleven Sports 
 La Liga - Live coverage & highlights on Eleven Sports
 Segunda División - Highlights on Eleven Sports
 Copa del Rey - Live coverage & highlights on Eleven Sports
 Serie A - Live coverage & highlights on Eleven Sports
 Coppa Italia - Live coverage & highlights on Eleven Sports
 DFB Pokal - Live coverage & highlights on Eleven Sports
 Eredivisie - Live coverage & highlights on Eleven Sports
 Chinese Super League - Live coverage & highlights on Eleven Sports
 Major League Soccer - Live coverage & highlights on Eleven Sports

Premier Sports & Freesports  
 Primeira Liga - Live Coverage on Premier Sports & Freesports

BBC Sport Scotland 
 Scottish Premier League - Live coverage & Delayed coverage on BBC Alba & Highlights on BBC Sport Scotland (Live on Sky Sports & BT Sport)
 Scottish Football League - Live on BBC Alba & Highlights on BBC Sport Scotland (Live on Sky Sports & BT Sport)
 Scottish Cup - Live coverage & Highlights on BBC Sport Scotland (Also live on Sky Sports)
 Scottish Challenge Cup - Live on BBC Alba

BBC Sport NI  
 IFA Premiership - Highlights on BBC Sport NI
 Irish Cup - Live coverage & Highlights on BBC Sport NI
 Irish League Cup - Live coverage & Highlights on BBC Sport NI
 Milk Cup - Live coverage & Highlights on BBC Sport NI

S4C  
 Welsh Premier League - Live coverage & Highlights on S4C
 Welsh Cup - Live coverage & Highlights on S4C
 Sgorio - Selected Highlights from European Football
 Welsh national team - Highlights of Welsh matches on S4C (Live on Sky Sports)

See also

IFA Premiership
Premier League
Scottish Premier League
Serie A
Russian Premier League
Bundesliga
Major League Soccer
Portuguese Liga
La Liga
Eredivisie

References

External links
 History of football on TV in 1980s, World of Sport
 Sky Sports
 ESPN UK
 BBC Sport
 Live Football on TV
 WherestheMatch.com Live Football on TV Guide
 MatchOn.TV - UK TV Football Guide

Sports television in the United Kingdom
Football in the United Kingdom